The MS-II was a proposed further development of the S-II rocket stage developed by North American Aviation.

Rocket Specifications 

Mass: 521,447 kg (1,149,593 lb)
Empty Mass: 49,877 kg (109,959 lb)
Thrust(vac): 5,165.790 kN (1,161316 lbf)
Isp: 425 s Burn Time: 361 s
Propellants: Lox/LH2. Isp(sl): 306 s
Diameter: 10.06 m (33.00 ft)
Span: 10.06 m (33.00 ft)
Length: 25.88 m (84.90 ft)
Engines: 5x J-2

External links
 astronautix.com

Rocket engines